Siah Makan or Seyah Makan, also rendered as Sia Makan, may refer to:
 Siah Makan-e Bozorg